Asura platyrhabda is a moth of the family Erebidae. It is found on Sulawesi.

References

platyrhabda
Moths described in 1935
Moths of Indonesia